Military Trail may refer to:

Florida State Road 809 in Florida, United States
Military Trail, a road in Toronto, Ontario, Canada once part of Danforth Avenue